Bessel is a small lunar impact crater that is located in the southern half of the Mare Serenitatis. The crater was named after the German astronomer Friedrich Wilhelm Bessel in 1935. Despite its small size, this is the largest crater to lie entirely within the mare. It lies to the north-northeast of the crater Menelaus.

This crater is circular and bowl-shaped with a rim that has a higher albedo than the floor or the surrounding mare. The outer rim is not significantly worn, and there are no features of note on the interior, apart from some slumping of material from the inner walls to the floor. Bessel is not of sufficient size to have developed the terrace structures of larger craters. A large ray, most likely from Tycho, crosses the mare from north to south, passing Bessel's western side.

Satellite craters 
By convention these features are identified on lunar maps by placing the letter on the side of the crater midpoint that is closest to Bessel.

The following craters have been renamed by the IAU:
 Bessel A — See Sarabhai (crater).
 Bessel E — See Bobillier (crater).

See also 
 1552 Bessel, main-belt asteroid

References

External links 

 
 LTO-42D2 Bessel — L&PI topographic map

Related article
  - includes the crater Bessel

Impact craters on the Moon
Mare Serenitatis